Pressure is a 2002 thriller film, starring Kerr Smith and Lochlyn Munro. It was co-written and directed by Richard Gale. The film was first shown at the American Film Market on February 20, 2002, before being released direct-to-video on November 26, 2002.

Plot
On their way back home, two friends decide to stop at a bar. Nevertheless, one of the friends is seduced by Amber, a local girl. However, the girl and her lover plan to rob him. The lover accidentally shot himself, allowing the friends to escape, but his father is the local sheriff and starts a manhunt to capture the friends.

Cast
 Kerr Smith as Steve Hillman
 Lochlyn Munro as Patrick Fisher
 Angela Featherstone as Amber
 Adrien Dorval as Bo Cooper
 Michelle Harrison as Sara Laughlin

Reception
Pressure was nominated for one Leo Awards in the category of "Feature Length Drama: Best Editing".

References

External links
 
 

2002 thriller films
2002 films
American thriller films
2000s English-language films
2000s American films